Bancroft School in Worcester, Massachusetts, United States, is an independent, co-educational, PreK–12, college-preparatory day school. Students typically live in Central Massachusetts and MetroWest Boston. The school campus measures . The school has three divisions: pre-kindergarten and lower school, middle school, and upper school.

History
The School was named for George Bancroft, 1800–1891, educator, diplomat, philanthropist, and writer who helped found the U.S. Naval Academy and wrote the first comprehensive history of the United States.

1900: Bancroft School established at 93 Elm Street by a group of Worcester parents.
1922: Moved to new facilities on Sever Street.
1958: Moved to current location at 110 Shore Drive after Norton Abrasives (now a brand of Saint-Gobain) donated  of land.
1969: Converted to fully co-ed. Prior to 1969, the Lower and Middle Schools served both boys and girls, but the Upper School enrolled girls only.
1970s: Added language lab, a larger woodworking shop, a new gym, an art building,  and expanded playing fields.
1980s and 1990s: Dedicated the Art Center, Fletcher Athletic Center, Fuller Science Center, Harrington Performing Arts Theatre, Stoddard Center, and Garfield and Prouty Libraries.
2002: Renovated the Fuller Science Center and opened the McDonough Center, which houses the Lower and Middle School programs.
2009: Signed agreement with Tongji University, Shanghai, China, to establish a teacher and student exchange program between Bancroft and Tongji’s Number 1 High School.
2010: Installed 462 high-efficiency solar panels on the McDonough Center roof.
2011: Installed an additional 434 solar panels on the roof of the Fletcher Athletic Center.
2011: Initiated the region’s first iPad initiative for classroom teaching and learning.

Photos

Athletics
As one of the 11 member schools in the Eastern Independent League (EIL), Bancroft competes in a number of sports with other teams in the New England Preparatory School Athletic Council (NEPSAC).

Athletic Offerings 
MS teams include:

 Boys: Baseball, Basketball, Lacrosse, Soccer, Tennis
 Girls: Basketball, Field Hockey, Lacrosse, Soccer, Softball, Volleyball
 Coed: Cross Country, Tennis

US varsity teams include:

 Boys: Baseball, Basketball, Crew, Lacrosse, Soccer, Tennis
 Girls: Basketball, Crew, Field Hockey, Lacrosse, Soccer, Tennis, Softball, Volleyball
 Coed: Alpine Skiing, Cross Country, Track & Field, Golf, Swim
Bancroft's athletic program has produced EIL and NEPSAC Championships across a number of its sports.

Record-Setting Volleyball Program 
Bancroft's girls' volleyball program was established in 1996 by coach Bob Stein and Athletic Director Steve Kelley. Within three years, the Bulldogs claimed their first EIL Championship. Between 1999-00 and 2012, Bancroft won 12 consecutive Eastern Independent League titles and five straight NEPSAC Championships. In the midst of this run, the Bulldogs set the Massachusetts state record for consecutive wins by winning their 111th straight game on January 16, 2009 against Dana Hall School. The streak continued until October 5, 2011 when Bancroft fell to Buckingham Browne & Nichols after winning 168 consecutive matches.

Headmasters & Headmistresses
1900–1915: Frank Robson
1915–1926: Miriam Titcomb
1926–1938: Hope Fisher
1938–1943: Bradford Kingman
1943–1959: Henry Tiffany
1944–1946: Edith Jones (interim)
1959–1960: Elizabeth Vandemoer (interim)
1960–1981: Wyatt Garfield
1981–1992: Marigolden Tritschler
1992–1998: Theodore G. Sharp
1998–1999: Wyatt Garfield & Edgar Gauthier (interim-heads)
1999–2014: Scott R. Reisinger
2014–2022: James P. "Trey" Cassidy
2022-present: Tim Saburn (interim)

Notable alumni

Notable alumni of Bancroft School include:
Jamie Dinan, Class of 1977; investor and founder of York Capital Management
Esther Forbes, Class of 1908; winner of the 1943 Pulitzer Prize for History for a biography of Paul Revere and the 1944 Newbery Medal for Johnny Tremain
 Mahlon Hoagland, biochemist, discoverer of amino-acid activating enzymes
 Myra Kraft (née Hiatt) (1942–2011), Bancroft Class of 1960; philanthropist with the New England Patriots Charitable Foundation, Robert K. and Myra H. Kraft Foundation, American Repertory Theatre, Brandeis University, United Way of Massachusetts Bay, Boys and Girls Clubs of Boston, Kraft Stadium for American football in Jerusalem
 Denise Eisenberg Rich, Class of 1962; New York socialite
 Robert Waring Stoddard, Class of 1923; former editor of the Worcester Telegram & Gazette;  one of the founders of the John Birch Society
 Jackson Stell, Class of 2009, also known as Big Wild; an electronic DJ, producer, composer, and engineer.

References

External links
Bancroft School official website

Private high schools in Massachusetts
Educational institutions established in 1900
High schools in Worcester, Massachusetts
Private middle schools in Massachusetts
Private elementary schools in Massachusetts
1900 establishments in Massachusetts